Dinamo Sports Complex is a constructivist building in Tsentralny City District of Novosibirsk, Russia. It is located along Oktyabrskaya Magistral. The building was built in 1933. Architects: Boris Gordeyev, S. P. Turgenev, V. N. Nikitin.

History
Before the construction of the complex, the location of the future Oktyabrskaya Magistral was taken into account, this street was already in the project in 1927. As a result, the sports complex was the first building that marked the direction of the magistral.

References

External links
 Спортивный клуб «Динамо». Novosibdom.ru.

Constructivist architecture
Buildings and structures in Novosibirsk
Buildings and structures completed in 1933
Tsentralny City District, Novosibirsk
Cultural heritage monuments of regional significance in Novosibirsk Oblast